The 68th Annual Tony Awards were held June 8, 2014, to recognize achievement in Broadway productions during the 2013–14 season. The ceremony was held at Radio City Music Hall in New York City, and was televised live on CBS. Hugh Jackman was the host, his fourth time hosting. The 15 musical Tony Awards went to seven different musicals, and six plays shared the 11 play Tony Awards.
	
The nominations were announced on April 29, 2014 by Jonathan Groff and Lucy Liu. Audra McDonald won the Tony Award for Best Actress in a Play. In just her ninth Broadway engagement, McDonald established two records as the first actor to win six Tony Awards for acting and the first to win in all four categories, lead and featured in both a play and a musical. In its seventh Broadway incarnation, The Glass Menagerie won its first Tony Award (Lighting Design).

Aladdin'''s win made it the fourth franchise to complete EGOT status.

 Eligibility 

Shows that opened on Broadway during the 2013–14 season before April 24, 2014, were eligible for consideration.

Original playsAct OneAll the WayBronx BombersCasa ValentinaLady Day at Emerson's Bar and GrillMothers and SonsOutside MullingarThe Realistic JonesesThe Snow GeeseA Time to KillThe Velocity of AutumnOriginal musicalsAfter MidnightAladdinBeautiful: The Carole King MusicalBig FishThe Bridges of Madison CountyBullets Over BroadwayFirst DateA Gentleman's Guide to Love and MurderIf/ThenA Night with Janis JoplinRocky the MusicalSoul DoctorPlay revivalsBetrayalThe Cripple of InishmaanThe Glass MenagerieMacbethMachinalNo Man's LandOf Mice and MenA Raisin in the SunRichard IIIRomeo and JulietTwelfth NightWaiting for GodotThe Winslow BoyMusical revivalsCabaretHedwig and the Angry InchLes MisérablesVioletCeremony
During the opening sequence of the ceremony, Jackman hopped along to the song "Take Me to Broadway," in an homage to Bobby Van's hopping in the 1953 film Small Town Girl.

The ceremony included performances from the nominated musicals (both new and revival) as well as other current musicals. The performances include:

Neil Patrick Harris (who hosted the last 3 ceremonies) and the cast of Hedwig and the Angry Inch performing "Sugar Daddy," Sutton Foster with the cast of Violet performing a medley of "On My Way" and "Raise You Up," Alan Cumming and the cast of Cabaret performing "Wilkommen," and Idina Menzel performing "Always Starting Over: from If/Then.

From the other shows that were nominated either for Best Musical or Best Revival. Those performances include:

James Monroe Iglehart, Adam Jacobs, and the cast of Aladdin performing "Friend Like Me"; Ramin Karimloo and the cast of Les Misérables performing "One Day More"; Jessie Mueller and the cast of Beautiful: The Carole King Musical performing a medley of "Will You Still Love Me Tomorrow" and "I Feel The Earth Move" (with Carole King herself); Bryce Pinkham, Lisa O'Hare, and Lauren Worsham from A Gentleman's Guide to Love and Murder performing "I've Decided to Marry You"; the cast of Bullets Over Broadway performing "T'Aint Nobody's Business"; and Andy Karl and the cast of Rocky performing "Eye of the Tiger" and the Final Box Fight scene.

Additionally, Wicked performed to celebrate its 10th anniversary, with Christine Dwyer and Jenni Barber in a performance of "For Good"; Patti LaBelle, Gladys Knight and Fantasia performed with the cast of After Midnight; and Sting performed a song from his new musical The Last Ship. Jennifer Hudson sang from a new musical, Finding Neverland.

The finale included Jackman in a dance number with all the Tony Award winners on stage.

The presenters included: 

Kevin Bacon
Matt Bomer
Wayne Brady
Zach Braff
Kenneth Branagh
Patricia Clarkson
Bradley Cooper
Alan Cumming
Fran Drescher
Clint Eastwood
Emilio Estefan
Gloria Estefan
Vera Farmiga
Tony Goldwyn
Anna Gunn
Maggie Gyllenhaal
Ethan Hawke
Carole King
Zachary Levi

Orlando Bloom
Tina Fey
Jonathan Groff
LL Cool J
Samuel L. Jackson
Judith Light
Lucy Liu
Kate Mara
Leighton Meester
Audra McDonald
Alessandro Nivola
Zachary Quinto
Emmy Rossum
Rosie O'Donnell
T.I.
 Patrick Wilson

Gans, Andrew.  "Tony Awards Gets Starrier; Ten Additional Artists Announced for Broadway's Biggest Night"  playbill.com, June 5, 2014

New award
During this ceremony, a new award was announced by Zachary Quinto and Matt Bomer, the "Tony Honor for Excellence in Theatre Education", which is to be presented by Carnegie Mellon University and will "honor kindergarten through high school (K-12) theatre educators."

Television ratings
According to the preliminary numbers, the televised awards ceremony had 7.02 million viewers. The 2013 telecast had 7.24 million viewers.

Winners and nominees
The nominees were announced on April 29, 2014. The winners are shown below.

Multiple wins

 4: A Gentleman's Guide to Love and Murder, Hedwig and the Angry Inch 3: A Raisin in the Sun 2: All the Way, Beautiful: The Carole King Musical, Lady Day at Emerson's Bar and Grill, The Bridges of Madison County, Twelfth NightMultiple nominations
 10: A Gentleman's Guide to Love and Murder 8: Hedwig and the Angry Inch 7: After Midnight, Beautiful: The Carole King Musical, The Glass Menagerie, Twelfth Night 6: Bullets Over Broadway, The Cripple of Inishmaan 5: Act One, Aladdin, A Raisin in the Sun 4: The Bridges of Madison County, Casa Valentina, Machinal, Rocky the Musical, Violet 3: Les Misérables 2: All the Way, Cabaret, If/Then, Lady Day at Emerson's Bar and Grill, Mothers and Sons, Of Mice and Men''

Non-competitive awards
The Isabelle Stevenson Award was given to Rosie O’Donnell "for her commitment to arts education for New York City’s public school children." The Special Tony Award for Lifetime Achievement was awarded to Jane Greenwood "for her outstanding work in costume design and for her dedication to the theatre".

The award for Tony Honors for Excellence in the Theatre was awarded to Actors Fund president Joe Benincasa, photographer Joan Marcus and general manager Charlotte Wilcox.

The Regional Theatre Award was awarded to the Signature Theatre Company, New York City. This is the first time a New York-based theatre company has received this award, whose eligibility had been expanded to include New York City for the 2013–14 season.

In Memoriam

Mitch Leigh
Sarah Marshall
Sid Caesar
Sheila MacRae
Martin Gottfried
Miller Wright
James Gandolfini
Phyllis Frelich
William Dodds
Chuck Patterson
Julie Harris
Kelly Garrett
Faith Geer
Ashton Springer
Philip Seymour Hoffman
Jane Connell
Frank Gero
Mickey Rooney
David Rogers
Shirley Herz
Clayton Corzatte
Mitchell Erickson
Seth Popper
Regina Resnik
Leslie Lee
Eydie Gorme
Kathleen Raitt
Michael Filerman
Martin Gold
Jacques LeSourd
Anna Crouse
Stephen Porter
Nicholas Martin
Paul Rogers
Gene Feist
Maya Angelou

See also
 Drama Desk Awards
 2014 Laurence Olivier Awards – equivalent awards for West End theatre productions
 Obie Award
 New York Drama Critics' Circle
 Theatre World Award
 Lucille Lortel Awards

References

External links
 Tony Awards official site

Tony Awards ceremonies
2014 theatre awards
2014 awards in the United States
2014 in New York City
2010s in Manhattan
Television shows directed by Glenn Weiss